Qamar ud-Din, or Kamaruddin etc. is a Muslim male or female name or (in modern usage) surname. In Arabic, Qamar ud-Din (قمر الدين) means "Moon of the Religion", and also refers to an apricot-based beverage. It may refer to:

Men 
Kamaru Usman, MMA fighter, former UFC Welterweight Champion
Qamar-ud-din Khan Dughlat, Mongol ruler of Moghulistan between 1368 and 1392
Qamar-ud-din Khan, Asaf Jah I (1671–1748), founder of the Asaf Jahi dynasty of Hyderabad
Khwaja Qamar ul Din Sialvi (1906–1981), Pakistani religious leader and politician
Qamaruddin Khan, original name of Bismillah Khan (1916–2006), Indian shehnai player
Raja Petra Kamarudin (born 1950), British-Malaysian journalist
Kamaruddin Jaafar (born 1951), Malaysian politician
Suhaimi Kamaruddin, Malaysian politician
Haziq Kamaruddin (1993–2021), Malaysian Olympic archer
Kamarul Afiq Kamaruddin (born 1986), Malaysian footballer
Kamarudin Meranun, Malaysian businessman

Women 
Qamar Aden Ali (1957–2009), Somali politician
Zuraida Kamaruddin (born 1958), Malaysian politician

Other
Qamar al-Din, a Syrian apricot drink popular during the month of Ramadan

See also
Quammruddin Nagar, town in the Indian state of Delhi

Arabic feminine given names
Arabic masculine given names